Sophia of Wittelsbach (1170–1238) was a daughter of Otto I Wittelsbach, who was Count Palatine and later Duke of Bavaria, and his wife Agnes of Loon.

In 1196, Sophia married Landgrave Hermann I of Thuringia; she was his second wife.  They had the following children:
 Irmgard (b. 1197), married in 1211 to Count Henry I of Anhalt
 Louis IV (1200–1227)
 Herman (1202–1216)
 Conrad (1204–1247), grand master of the Teutonic Knights
 Henry Raspe (1204–1247)
 Agnes, married twice:
 in 1225 to Henry "the Profane" of Babenberg (1208–1228), a son of Margrave Leopold IV of Austria
 in 1229 to Duke Albert I of Saxony ( – 1261)

House of Wittelsbach
1170 births
1238 deaths
13th-century German women
Daughters of monarchs